Street Called Desire  is the fourth and final album album by American singing duo René & Angela. This would be their only album released on the Mercury label. The album includes the number-one R&B hits "Save Your Love (For #1)" and "Your Smile", and the two top-5 R&B hits "I'll Be Good" and "You Don't Have to Cry".

Track listing
Written by Rene & Angela.
"Save Your Love (For #1)" – 4:20 	
"I'll Be Good" – 5:14 	
"No How – No Way" – 5:00 	
"You Don't Have to Cry" – 5:53 	
"Street Called Desire" – 4:40 	
"Your Smile" – 4:26 	
"Who's Foolin' Who" – 5:06 	
"Drive My Love" – 4:09

Personnel
Angela Winbush – Lead & Backing Vocals, Keyboards
René Moore – Keyboards, Synthesizer (Synth Bass), Lead & Backing Vocals
Kurtis Blow – Rap
Jeff Lorber, Ramsey Embick – Keyboards
Donald Griffin, Michael McGloiry, Paul Jackson, Jr., Paul Pesco, Tony Maiden – Guitars
Bobby Watson – Bass
Andre Fischer, John Robinson, Leon "Ndugu" Chancler, Rayford Griffin – Drums
Paulinho Da Costa – Percussion
Ambrose Price, Derwin Suttle – Handclaps

Charts

Weekly charts

Year-end charts

Singles

References

External links
 René & Angela-Street Called Desire at Discogs

1985 albums
Mercury Records albums
René & Angela albums